Renate Adolph (born 20 March 1954 in East Berlin) is a former politician for the Die Linke and its predecessors, the Socialist Unity Party of Germany (SED) and the PDS. She became a member of the party in 1976, and a local councillor in 2003.

In 2004, Adolph was elected to the Landtag of the state of Brandenburg. She resigned from the Landtag in November 2009, after she had admitted being an informer for the East German communist secret police Stasi. Against Die Linke policy, she failed to declare publicly this history.

See also 
Gerlinde Stobrawa

References 

1954 births
Living people
People from East Berlin
Politicians from Berlin
Socialist Unity Party of Germany politicians
Party of Democratic Socialism (Germany) politicians
The Left (Germany) politicians
Members of the Landtag of Brandenburg
21st-century German politicians
People of the Stasi
East German women
20th-century German women politicians
21st-century German women politicians